Nointel may refer to:
 Nointel, Oise, a commune in the Oise department, France
 Nointel, Val-d'Oise, a commune in the Val-d'Oise department, France

See also
Charles Marie François Olier, marquis de Nointel (1635—1685), French ambassador to the Ottoman court